William Graber (born June 3, 1996) is an ice hockey center from the United States who currently reprecents Porin Ässät of the Finnish Liiga. He can also play as a defenceman.

Career 
In the 2021–2022 season Graber played for the Komets of the ECHL in 59 games and scoring 83 points. He had the best plus/minus in the league (+37), most assists (57) and most points (83). He was selected as the most valuable player in the ECHL.

Graber signed a 1+1 style contract with Ässät of the Liiga. Graber made his Liiga debut playing in the 2nd line with Jesse Joensuu and Joachim Rohdin on 14 September 2022 in a game against Ilves.

Career statistics

References 

Ässät players
American ice hockey players
1996 births
Living people